Abolqasem Salavati is an Iranian judge and former head of the 15th branch of the Islamic Revolutionary Court in Tehran, Iran. In recent years, he had been the judge of numerous controversial cases. He was sanctioned by the United States and the European Union.

He is one of the judges whom human rights organizations have highlighted as being the instruments of a crackdown on journalists and political activists under the influence of Iran's intelligence and security apparatus. Besides Salavati, the other revolutionary court judges include Mohammad Moghiseh, former justices Yahya Pirabbasi and Hassan Zare Dehnavi (known as judge Haddad), judge of Court of Media, Bijan Ghasemzadeh, and appeal judges Hassan Babaee, Ahmad Zargar and Qazi Sadat. These judges are accused of overseeing miscarriages of justice in trials in which journalists, lawyers, political activists, and members of Iran's ethnic and religious minorities have been condemned to lengthy prison terms, lashes, and even execution.

Career
Iranian human rights and political activists call him Iran's Hanging Judge along with Mohammad Moghiseh and Yahya Pirabbasi.

In September 2014 he presided over the case of a man, Mohsen Amiraslani, executed for heresy for describing Jonah and the Whale as an allegory.

On 1 June 2015, judge Salavati convicted the cartoonist Atena Farghadani to 12 years and nine months in prison on the charges of colluding against national security, spreading propaganda against the system, and insulting members of the parliament through her artwork. She had depicted Iranian government officials as monkeys and goats in protest of a draft law that would outlaw voluntary sterilization and restrict access to measures of birth control.

In November 2022, Salavati presided over the trial of Mohsen Shekari. Shekari was convicted of injuring a member of Iran's Basij militia during the Mahsa Amini protests. He was found guilty of drawing a weapon, with the intention of killing, causing terror and disturbing the order and security of society, as well as of Moharebeh (waging war against God). Shekari was sentenced to death despite Salavati having the choice to impose a lighter sentence, such as deportation.  Mohsen was 22 years old when he was executed by hanging on 8 December 2022.

Judicial rulings 

 Mohammad Gholamzadeh sentenced to 5 years imprisonment, charged with conspiring by participating in student assemblies.
 Supervised a preliminary session for several detainees of the Mahsa Amini protests, issuing charges for 315 people, including:
 Mohammad Ghobadlou and Saeed Shirazi charged with Efsad-E-Fel Arz, or loosely translated, as Corruption on Earth.
 Saman Seyyedi charged with assembly and conspiring to act against national security.
 Mohammad Boroughani charged with moharebeh.
 Abdolfazl Mehri-Hossein Hajilou charged with opposing the Islamic government by setting a public transport vehicle ablaze.
 Mohsen Rezazadeh Gharogholou charged with moharebeh, assembly, and conspiring to act against national security.
 Mostafa Tajzadeh sentenced to a total of 8 years imprisonment, charged with assembly and conspiring to act against national security (5 years), distribution of false information (2 years), and advertising against the government (1 year). Tajzadeh's lawyer, Houshang Pourbabaee, tweeted that his client did not appeal the sentence and will be serving 5 years per law.
 Reza Eslami, professor of human rights at Shahid Beheshti University, sentenced to 7 years imprisonment and banned from teaching and leaving the country. Eslami had previously been accused of cooperating with the US against the Islamic Republic by hosting a workshop in the Czech Republic. He denies having any involvement with the US government, stating that the American party was an NGO and he was unaware of any affiliations between the NGO and the US government. 14 of his 15 students were pardoned; however, one person was referred to the general parquet on the basis of removing the mandatory hijab in Turkey.
 Kameel Ahmady, sentenced to 9 years imprisonment and a 60,000€ fine, charged with cooperation with the government of the enemy. He has allegedly been pushing for socio-cultural reforms, such as raising the minimum age requirement for marriage. According to Tasnim News, Ahmady had been in contact with several European embassies in Iran, had submitted a falsified report to the United Nations special rapporteur against the Islamic Republic, and traveled to Israel disguised as a BBC reporter.
 Hoda Amid, women's rights activist, sentenced to 8 years imprisonment, a 2 year limitation imposed on her social rights, and a 2 year ban from practicing law. She was charged with cooperating with the US government against the Islamic Republic on affairs pertaining to women and the family, according to section 508 of the Islamic Prosecution Laws.
 Najme Vahedi, women's right activist, sentenced to 7 years imprisonment, and a 2 year limitation imposed on her social rights. She was similarly charged as Hoda Amid, during the same court session, with cooperation with the US against the Islamic Republic.
 Emad Sharghi, an Iranian-American, sentenced to 10 years imprisonment, charged with espionage.

Controversy 
Salavati is among the 32 officials sanctioned by the European Union in April 2011 who have committed human rights abuses after the 2009 disputed election.

In December 2019, the U.S. Treasury Department sanctioned Salavati for "censorship or other activities that prohibit, limit, or penalize the exercise of freedom of expression or assembly by citizens of Iran".

Personal life 
His daughter, Samaneh Salavati, is an artist.

Alleged assassination 
Salavati is claimed to have been assassinated in his house on 5 January 2023 located at the end of Aban Street, cornering Shariati Street, Tehran, Iran. The assassin(s) drove up to Salavati's house at 22:00 and were able to enter his garage, armed with a 9mm Colt pistol. They exclaimed, "This one is for our brothers and sisters, you murderer", before shooting him to death with 5 bullets. 

Government officials have not yet made any announcements regarding his alleged death. Mehdi Keshtdar, CEO of Mizan News Agency, which is closely affiliated with the Islamic Republic's judicial system, dismisses Salavati's death as fake news propagated by the critics of the Islamic Republic. In a recent tweet, he claims to have spoken with Salavati after the alleged assassination, and that Salavati is safe and sound. Keshtdar writes, "[Salavati] found out about his assassination after my phone call".

References 

21st-century Iranian judges
Living people
Place of birth missing (living people)
Year of birth missing (living people)
Iranian individuals subject to the U.S. Department of the Treasury sanctions
Specially Designated Nationals and Blocked Persons List